Mel Brooks is an actor, comedian, and filmmaker of the stage, television, and screen. He started his work as a comedy writer, actor, and then director of 11 feature films including The Producers (1967), Young Frankenstein (1974), and Blazing Saddles (1974). He is also known for his work on Broadway including, The Producers (2001).

Film

Acting roles

Producing credit

Television

Acting roles

Theatre

Other credits

Collaborators
Brooks cast certain actors in more than one of his films. His most frequent collaborators were Rudy De Luca (7 films); Dom DeLuise (6 films); Madeline Kahn, Harvey Korman, Charlie Callas, Carol Arthur, and Robert Ridgely (4 films each).

References 

American filmographies
filmography